The Bernard Tucker Medal is awarded by the British Trust for Ornithology for services to ornithology.  It is named in memory of Bernard Tucker, their first Secretary.  It has been awarded since 1954, usually annually although there are some years when no medals were awarded.

Bernard Tucker Medallists
Source: British Trust for Ornithology

20th Century

21st Century

See also

 List of ornithology awards

External links
Past medallists

Ornithology awards
British Trust for Ornithology
1954 establishments in the United Kingdom
Awards established in 1954